Kevin Scully Geer (November 7, 1952 – January 25, 2017) was an American actor of stage and screen.

Kevin Geer's father died when he was an infant. He moved from Reno, Nevada, to Los Angeles with his mother, Claire Scully Geer. After graduating from a military academy in southern California, he moved to New York to become an actor, beginning his career in 1975, his best noted stage performances included A Streetcar Named Desire (1988), The Rose Tattoo (1995), Flyovers, Side Man (both 1998) and Twelve Angry Men (2004).

His television appearances included Oz, Law & Order, Homicide, China Beach, M*A*S*H and MacGyver. He also appeared in the films A Force of One (1979), The Pelican Brief (1993), The Contender (2000), American Gangster (2007), Bunker Hill (2008) and The Men Who Stare at Goats (2009).

Geer was born in Reno, Nevada, and raised in Los Angeles, California. He died from a heart attack on January 25, 2017, at his Manhattan home. He was 64. He received the 2017 Obie Award for Outstanding Performance in memoriam of his sustained excellence in the theatre and dedication to his craft.

Filmography
 Sweet Bird of Youth (1989) as Tom Junior

References

External links
 
 
 

1952 births
2017 deaths
Actors from Reno, Nevada
American male film actors
American male stage actors
American male television actors
Male actors from Los Angeles
Male actors from Nevada
20th-century American male actors
21st-century American male actors